Clito is a Neotropical genus of spread-winged skipper in the family Hesperiidae.

Species
Recognised species in the genus Clito include:
 Clito aberrans (Draudt, 1924)

References

Natural History Museum Lepidoptera genus database

External links

images representing Clito at Consortium for the Barcode of Life

Pyrgini
Hesperiidae of South America
Butterfly genera